Abou Gariga Maïga (born 20 September 1985) is a Beninese professional footballer who plays as a forward for La Tamponnaise.

Club career
Maïga was born in Allahé, Benin and came to France in 2004. His Beninese club was Requins de l'Atlantique FC.

International career
Maïga played at the 2005 FIFA World Youth Championship, scoring one goal.

External links

Living people
1985 births
People from Allahé
Association football forwards
Beninese footballers
Benin international footballers
2008 Africa Cup of Nations players
Ligue 2 players
Championnat National players
Championnat National 2 players
Championnat National 3 players
Qatari Second Division players
Requins de l'Atlantique FC players
US Créteil-Lusitanos players
Louhans-Cuiseaux FC players
US Changé players
Mesaimeer SC players
Saint-Colomban Sportive Locminé players
US Saint-Malo players
Voltigeurs de Châteaubriant players
AS Vitré players
AS Cannes players
Beninese expatriate footballers
Beninese expatriate sportspeople in France
Expatriate footballers in France
Expatriate footballers in Qatar